Sheetal Angural is an Indian politician representing the Jalandhar West Assembly constituency in the Punjab Legislative Assembly. He is a member of the Aam Aadmi Party. The Aam Aadmi Party gained a strong 79% majority in the sixteenth Punjab Legislative Assembly by winning 92 out of 117 seats seats in the 2022 Punjab Legislative Assembly election. MLA Bhagwant Mann was sworn in as Chief Minister on 16 March 2022.

Career

2022 Punjab assembly elections  
Sheetal Angural won 2022 Punjab assembly elections from Jalandhar West constituency by defeating Sushil Rinku of Indian National Congress by 4253 votes.

Member of Legislative Assembly
He represents the Jalandhar West Assembly constituency as MLA in Punjab Assembly.

Committee assignments of Punjab Legislative Assembly
Member (2022–23) Committee on Welfare of Scheduled Castes, Scheduled Tribes and Backward Classes 
Member (2022–23) Committee on Government Assurances

Electoral performance

References

Living people
Punjab, India MLAs 2022–2027
Aam Aadmi Party politicians from Punjab, India
Year of birth missing (living people)